|}

The Saudi Cup (Arabic: كأس السعودية) is an international horse race held at King Abdulaziz Racetrack in Riyadh, Saudi Arabia. It is the richest horse race ever held, with a $20 million purse.

Race details
The race is notable for its 20 million dollar purse, which makes it the most lucrative event in horse racing. 

The race is held four weeks after the $3 million Pegasus World Cup at Gulfstream Park, Florida, and four weeks before the $12 million Dubai World Cup at Meydan Racecourse, Dubai, making it possible for horses in those races to compete.

In 2021, the Pegasus World Cup in the United States and the Champions Cup in Japan were "Win and You're In" qualifiers for the Saudi Cup.

The International Federation of Horseracing Authorities' Grading and Race Planning Advisory Committee assigned Group 1 status to the Saudi Cup before its third running, scheduled for February 2022.

History
The first edition of the race was held on February 29, 2020. It was won by an American horse, Maximum Security, ridden by Luis Saez. The Jockey Club of Saudi Arabia announced two months later that it would withhold Maximum Security's purse money pending an investigation, following the indictment of trainer Jason Servis in the United States. As of October 2021, there has been no resolution on the purse matter.

Winners

*Maximum Security's first-place purse has been held pending an investigation by the Jockey Club of Saudi Arabia.

References

 Racing Post:

 
Open mile category horse races
Horse races in Saudi Arabia
Sport in Riyadh
2020 establishments in Saudi Arabia
Recurring sporting events established in 2020